Brazhnikov is a Russian masculine surname, its feminine counterpart is Brazhnikova. It may refer to
Anna Brazhnikova (born 1991), Swedish tennis player
Vladimir Brazhnikov (1941–2011), Russian football coach

See also
Alosa braschnikowi (Brazhnikov's shad)

Russian-language surnames